The Harrisburg Broadcast Network, branded as WHBG TV 20, is a Public, educational, and government access (PEG) cable TV channel in the city of Harrisburg, Pennsylvania. Despite its call sign, it is not an FCC-sanctioned terrestrial television station. It is seen in Harrisburg on Comcast cable channel 20.

External links
 Harrisburg Broadcast Network Official website
 About page from City website

Television stations in Pennsylvania
Mass media in Harrisburg, Pennsylvania
Television stations in Harrisburg, Pennsylvania
American public access television
Television channels and stations established in 1993